David Norris (21 June 1920 – 1972) was an Australian springboard diver who competed in the 1948 Summer Olympics, where he finished 16th. He was 5-times Australia 3m springboard champion, and also competed at the 1938 and 1950 British Empire Games.

References

1920 births
1972 deaths
Olympic divers of Australia
Divers at the 1948 Summer Olympics
Commonwealth Games competitors for Australia
Divers at the 1938 British Empire Games
Divers at the 1950 British Empire Games
Australian male divers
20th-century Australian people